Paul Kraske (2 June 1851, Berg, Province of Silesia – 15 June 1930, Freiburg im Breisgau) was a German surgeon.

He studied medicine at the universities of Halle and Leipzig, receiving his doctorate at Halle in 1874. While a student, he served as a volunteer soldier in a fusilier regiment during the Franco-Prussian War. After graduation, he spent several years as an assistant to Richard von Volkmann at the surgical clinic in Halle, then from 1883 to 1919 was a professor and head of the surgical clinic at the University of Freiburg.

He held a particular interest in colorectal cancer, and is remembered for introducing a transsacral approach for the extirpation of cancers of the rectum ("Kraske's operation").

Selected works 
 Beiträge zur Lehre von dem Einflusse der Nerven auf die Ernährung der Gewebe, 1874 – Study on the influence of nerves involving the nutrition of tissues.
 Experimentelle Untersuchungen ueber die Regeneration der quergestreiften Muskeln, 1878 – Experimental studies on the regeneration of striated muscles.
 Die sacrale Methode der Exstirpation von Mastdarmkrebsen und die Resectio recti, 1887 – The sacral method for extirpation of rectal cancers and resection of the rectum.

References 

1851 births
1930 deaths
People from Bad Muskau
People from the Province of Silesia
German surgeons
University of Halle alumni
Leipzig University alumni
Academic staff of the University of Freiburg
German military personnel of the Franco-Prussian War